The Djowei are an indigenous Australian people of the Northern Territory.

Name
TBA.

Country
They lay between the Awarai and Djerimanga.

Alternative names
 Kumertuo, a name shared with the Jawoyn.

Notes

Citations

Sources

Aboriginal peoples of the Northern Territory